Rabinowitz (also Rabinowicz) (רבינוביץ), is a Polish-Lithuanian Ashkenazi Jewish surname, Slavic for "son of the rabbi". The Russian equivalents are Rabinovich or Rabinovitch.

It may refer to:

People
 Alan Rabinowitz (1953–2018), US zoologist
 Avraham Yissachar Dov Rabinowicz (1843–1892), Polish, second Radomsker Rebbe
 Azriel Rabinowitz (1905–1941), Lithuanian rabbi & Rosh Yeshiva
 Chaim Rabinowitz (1856–1930), Lithuanian rabbi & Rosh Yeshiva
 David L. Rabinowitz (born 1960), US astronomer
 Deborah Rabinowitz (1947–1987), US ecologist
 Dorothy Rabinowitz (active 1957-2013), US journalist
 Erick Elias Rabinowitz (born 1980), professional name "Erick Elías", Mexican actor
 Gamliel Rabinowitz (active 2005-6), Israeli Rosh Yeshiva
 Gloria Rabinowitz (active 1956-69), Canadian actor
 Harry Rabinowitz, South African-British conductor, composer
 Jacob J. Rabinowitz (1899–1960), US professor of law, emigrant to Israel
 Jay Rabinowitz (film editor) (active 1984 to present), US film editor
 Jay Rabinowitz (jurist) (1927–2001), US chief justice of Alaska Supreme Court (1965–1997)
 Jerome Rabinowitz (1918-98), birth name of US choreographer Jerome Robbins
 Joseph Rabinowitz (1837–1899), Russian founder of first Jewish Christian congregation in Russia.
 Louis Isaac Rabinowitz (1906–1984), British Orthodox rabbi
 Louis M. Rabinowitz (1887–1957), US businessman, philanthropist
 Loren Galler-Rabinowitz (born 1986), US figure skater
 Maurice Rabinowicz (born 1947), Belgian film director, writer
 Moritz Rabinowitz (1887-1942), Norwegian retail merchant, political activist
 Nik Rabinowitz (active 2012), South African comedian, actor, author
 Paul Rabinowitz (born 1939), US mathematician
 Philip Rabinowitz (mathematician) (1926-2006), Israeli mathematician
 Philip Rabinowitz (runner) (1904–2008), South African, fastest 100-year-old to run 100 meters
 Renee Rabinowitz (19342020), US-Israeli psychologist, lawyer
 Shlomo Rabinowicz (1801–1866), Polish, first Radomsker Rebbe
 Shlomo Chanoch Rabinowicz (1882–1942), Polish, fourth Radomsker Rebbe
 Sol Rabinowitz (1924-2013), US businessman, founder of New York City 1950s record label Baton Records
 Steve Rabinowitz (1957-), US political image maker
 Stuart Rabinowitz (active 2001-2020), US university president
 Victor Rabinowitz (1911–2007) US lawyer
 Yechezkel Rabinowicz (1864–1910), Polish, third Radomsker Rebbe
 Yehiel Rabinowitz (born 1939), Israeli sculptor, painter based in France

Other
 United States v. Rabinowitz, 339 U.S. 56 (1950), United States Supreme Court case

See also 
 Rabinovich
 Rabinovitch
 Russian jokes: Rabinovich
 Rabin
 Rabinow (surname)

Jewish surnames
Polish-language surnames
Slavic-language surnames
East Slavic-language surnames
Yiddish-language surnames